Edward Hugh John Neale Dalton, Baron Dalton,  (16 August 1887 – 13 February 1962) was a British Labour Party economist and politician who served as Chancellor of the Exchequer from 1945 to 1947. He shaped Labour Party foreign policy in the 1930s, opposing pacifism; promoting rearmament against the German threat; and strongly opposed the appeasement policy of Prime Minister Neville Chamberlain in 1938. Dalton served in Winston Churchill's wartime coalition cabinet; after the Dunkirk evacuation he was Minister of Economic Warfare, and established the Special Operations Executive. As Chancellor, he pushed his policy of cheap money too hard, and mishandled the sterling crisis of 1947. His political position was already in jeopardy in 1947 when he, seemingly inadvertently, revealed a sentence of the budget to a reporter minutes before delivering his budget speech. Prime Minister Clement Attlee accepted his resignation; Dalton later returned to the cabinet in relatively minor positions.

His biographer Ben Pimlott characterised Dalton as peevish, irascible, given to poor judgment and lacking administrative talent. Pimlott also recognised that Dalton was a genuine radical and an inspired politician; a man, to quote his old friend and critic John Freeman, "of feeling, humanity, and unshakeable loyalty to people which matched his talent."

Early life
Hugh Dalton was born in Neath, in Wales. His father, John Neale Dalton, was a Church of England clergyman who became chaplain to Queen Victoria, tutor to the princes George (later King George V) and Albert Victor, and a canon of Windsor.

Dalton was educated at Summer Fields School and then at Eton College. He then went up to King's College, Cambridge, where he was active in student politics; his socialist views, then very rare amongst undergraduates, earned him the nickname "Comrade Hugh". Whilst at Cambridge he was President of the Cambridge University Fabian Society. He did not succeed in becoming President of the Cambridge Union Society, despite three unsuccessful attempts to be elected Secretary.

He went on to study at the London School of Economics (LSE) and the Middle Temple. During the First World War he was called up into the Army Service Corps, later transferring to the Royal Artillery. He served as a lieutenant on the French and Italian fronts, where he was awarded the Italian decoration, the Medaglia di Bronzo al Valor Militare, in recognition of his "contempt for danger" during the retreat from Caporetto; he later wrote a memoir of the war called With British Guns in Italy. Following demobilisation, he returned to the LSE and the University of London as a lecturer, where he was awarded a DSc for a thesis on the principles of public finance in 1920.

There have been suggestions that he was homosexual, but they are rejected by his major biographer Ben Pimlott, who states "no evidence exists that Dalton ever had a sexual relationship with another man, and his private life seems to have been one of blameless monogamy." However he does refer to Dalton having "homosexual tendencies", mentioned below.

Political career 

Dalton stood unsuccessfully for Parliament four times: at the 1922 Cambridge by-election, in Maidstone at the 1922 general election, in Cardiff East at the 1923 general election, and the 1924 Holland with Boston by-election, before entering Parliament for Peckham at the 1924 general election.

At the 1929 general election, he succeeded his wife Ruth Dalton, who retired, as Labour Member of Parliament (MP) for Bishop Auckland. Widely respected for his intellectual achievements in economics, he rose in the Labour Party's ranks, with election in 1925 to the shadow cabinet and, with strong union backing, to the Labour Party National Executive Committee (NEC). He gained ministerial and foreign policy experience as Under-Secretary at the Foreign Office in Ramsay MacDonald's second government, between 1929 and 1931. He lost this position when he, and most Labour leaders, rejected MacDonald's National Government. As with most other Labour MPs, he lost his seat in 1931; he was elected again in 1935.

Dalton published Practical Socialism for Britain, a bold and highly influential assessment of a future Labour government's policy options, in 1935. The book revived updated nuts-and-bolts Fabianism, which had been out of favour, and could be used to attack the more militant Left. His emphasis was on using the state as a national planning agency, an approach that appealed well beyond Labour.

Foreign policy
Turning his attention to the looming crisis in Europe, he became the Labour Party's spokesman on foreign policy in Parliament. Pacifism had been a strong element in Labour Party (and other parties as well), but the Spanish Civil War changed that, as the Left moved to support arms for the Republican ("Loyalist") cause.  However Dalton was not enthusiastic for the Labour party policy of wanting to intervene in the Spanish Civil War, later stating:

I was far from enthusiastic for the slogan "arms for Spain" if this meant, as some of my friends eagerly did, that we were to supply arms which otherwise we should keep for ourselves, for I was much more conscious than most of my friends of the terrible insufficiency of British armaments against the German danger.

His views were different from those of Attlee, later recalling that before the Second World War he believed:

as Germany and Italy were potential enemies of Britain and Franco was their ally, it was in Britain's interest that Franco should not win the Spanish Civil War. It was on this proposition rather than any extravagant eulogy of the Spanish Government that I based most of my public references to this most tragic struggle.

Yet Dalton admitted he was wrong in this assessment of British interests, stating that "When the Germans overran France in 1940 and reached the Pyrenees, Franco was neutral, and with remarkable skill maintained his neutrality until the end of the war. Hitler respected this and never forced his way through Spain to attack Gibraltar or crossed the Straits into Morocco." and "Hitler would not have respected the neutrality of a Spanish Republican Government. If Franco had lost the Civil War, Hitler would have occupied Spain."

Aided by union votes, Dalton moved the party from semi-pacifism to a policy of armed deterrence and rejection of appeasement. He was a bitter enemy of Prime Minister Neville Chamberlain.  On 15 March 1939, Germany occupied the  Czech half of Czecho-Slovakia on 15 March 1939. Later that same day, Hitler during his visit to Prague proclaimed the Protectorate of Bohemia-Moravia. On 16 March 1939, Dalton played a leading role in the debates in the House of Commons about the end of Czechoslovak independence. Under the Munich Agreement, Britain had promised a "guarantee" of Czecho-Slovakia (as Czechoslovakia had been renamed in October 1938) against aggression in exchange for the Sudetenland being allowed to "go home to the Reich". Dalton in his speech to the House of Commons noted bitterly that Germany had just violated the Munich Agreement and that the British "guarantee" had proven worthless. Dalton stated that Chamberlain "should disappear from office", saying that the only decent thing left for him to do would be to resign immediately. Dalton called the newly declared state of Slovakia a sham as he stated the Slovak declaration of independence "had been paid for by German money...and organised by German agents".. Dalton called the Slovak declaration of independence "a convenient legal let-ago of the guarantee" as Chamberlain insisted that the "guarantee" was not longer valid as Czecho-Slovakia had ceased to exist on 14 March even before the Germans marched in on 15 March. In response to several Conservative MPs who called Czechoslovakia an "artificial" state created by the Treaty of Versailles, Dalton called Czechoslovakia "a once free and happy model democracy in Central Europe" and noted pointedly that he had actually visited Czechoslovakia a number of times, unlike his critics who had never been there. Dalton ended his speech by warning of "a rapidly increasing danger to Britain", supported the idea put forward by the former Foreign Secretary Anthony Eden for a bloc of states to resist further aggression and urged a barrier to further aggression under the slogan "thus far, but no further".

Second World War
When war came, Chamberlain's position became untenable after many Conservative MPs refused to support him in the Norway Debate in April 1940, and Dalton and other senior Labour leaders made clear they would join any coalition government except one headed by Chamberlain. After Chamberlain resigned early in May, and Lord Halifax had declined the position, Winston Churchill became Prime Minister. During Churchill's coalition government (1940–45) Dalton was Minister of Economic Warfare from 1940 to 1942. He established the Special Operations Executive, and was later a member of the executive committee of the Political Warfare Executive. He became President of the Board of Trade in 1942; the future Labour leader Hugh Gaitskell, drafted into the civil service during the war, was his Principal Private Secretary. In this position he tackled the price rings.

Chancellor of the Exchequer

After the unexpected Labour victory in the 1945 general election Dalton wished to become Foreign Secretary, but the job was instead given to Ernest Bevin. Dalton, with his skills in economics, became Chancellor of the Exchequer. Alongside Bevin, Clement Attlee, Herbert Morrison and Stafford Cripps, Dalton was one of the "Big Five" of the Labour government.

In his biography of Attlee and Churchill, Leo McKinstry wrote: "Attlee had initially decided that two of the other most vital jobs, the Treasury and the Foreign Office, should be filled by Bevin and Dalton respectively. But the King had baulked at the idea of Dalton as Foreign Secretary, seeing him as untrustworthy and partisan. Similarly, the Foreign Office exerted pressure against Dalton, the outgoing Foreign Secretary Anthony Eden declaring that ‘it should be Bevin’." 

The Treasury faced urgent problems. Half of the wartime economy had been devoted to mobilizing soldiers, warplanes, bombs and munitions; an urgent transition to a peacetime budget was necessary, while minimizing inflation. Financial aid through Lend Lease from the United States was abruptly and unexpectedly terminated in September 1945, and new loans from the United States and Canada were essential to keep living conditions tolerable. In the long run, Labour was committed to nationalization of industry and national planning of the economy, to more taxation of the rich and less of the poor, and to expanding the welfare state and creating free medical services for everyone.

During the war, most overseas investments had been sold to fund the cost of its prosecution (the state thus losing the income from them), and Britain suffered severe balance of payments problems. The $3.75 billion 50-year American loan negotiated by John Maynard Keynes in 1946 (and the $1.25 billion loan from Canada) was soon exhausted. By 1947, rationing had to be tightened and the convertibility of the pound suspended. In the atmosphere of crisis, Morrison and Cripps intrigued to replace Attlee with Bevin as Prime Minister; Bevin refused to play along, and Attlee bought off Cripps by giving him Morrison's responsibilities for economic planning. Ironically, of the "Big Five" it was Dalton who ultimately fell victim to the events of that year.

Cheaper money—that is, low interest rates—was an important goal for Dalton during his Chancellorship. He wanted to avoid the high interest rates and unemployment experienced after the First World War, and to keep down the cost of nationalization. He gained support for this cheaper money policy from Keynes, as well as from officials of the Bank of England and the Treasury.

Budgetary policy under Dalton was strongly progressive, as characterised by policies such as increased food subsidies, heavily subsidised rents to council house tenants, the lifting of restrictions on housebuilding, the financing of national assistance and family allowances, and extensive assistance to rural communities and Development Areas. Dalton was also responsible for funding the introduction of Britain's universal family allowances scheme, doing so "with a song in my heart", as he later put it. In one of his budgets, Dalton significantly increased spending on education (which included £4 million for the universities and the provision of free school milk), £38 million for the start (from August 1946) of family allowances, and an additional £10 million for Development Areas. In addition, the National Land Fund was established. Harold Macmillan, who inherited Dalton's housing responsibilities, later acknowledged his debt to Dalton's championing of New Towns, and was grateful for the legacy of Dalton's Town Development Bill, which encouraged urban overfill schemes and the movement of industry out of cities.

Food subsidies were maintained at high wartime levels in order to restrain living costs, while taxation structures were altered to benefit low-wage earners, with some 2.5 million workers taken out of the tax system altogether in Dalton's first two budgets. There were also increases in surtax and death duties, which were opposed by the Opposition. According to one historian, Dalton's policies as Chancellor reflected "an unprecedented emphasis by central government on the redistribution of income".

Budget-leaking and resignation
Walking into the House of Commons to give the autumn 1947 budget speech, Dalton made an off-the-cuff remark to a journalist, telling him of some of the tax changes in the budget. The news was printed in the early edition of the evening papers before he had completed his speech, and whilst the stock market was still open. This was a scandal, and led to his resignation for leaking a budget secret. He was succeeded by Stafford Cripps. Though initially implicated in the allegations that led to the Lynskey tribunal in 1948, he was ultimately exonerated officially, but his reputation suffered another blow.

Return to cabinet

Dalton returned to the cabinet in 1948, as Chancellor of the Duchy of Lancaster, making him a minister without portfolio. He became Minister of Town and Country Planning in 1950, the position being renamed as Minister of Local Government and Planning the following year. An avid outdoorsman, he served a term as president of the Ramblers Association, which promoted walking tours. As Chancellor in 1946 he had started the National Land Fund to resource national parks, and in 1951 he approved the Pennine Way, which involved the creation of 70 additional miles of rights of way. He still had the ear of the Prime Minister, and enjoyed promoting the careers of candidates with potential, but was no longer a major political player as he had been until 1947. He left government after Labour lost the 1951 general election.

Personal life
In 1914 Dalton married Ruth with whom he had a daughter who died in infancy in the early 1920s.

Dalton's biographer, Ben Pimlott, suggests that Dalton had homosexual tendencies but concludes he never acted on them. Michael Bloch, on the other hand, thinks that Dalton's love for Rupert Brooke, whom he met at Cambridge University's Fabian Society, went beyond the platonic, citing bike rides in the countryside and sleeping naked under the stars.

In 1908, Dalton also made advances at James Strachey, "waving an immense steaming penis in his face and chuckling softly", as Brooke reported to James' brother Lytton. In later life, Dalton seem to have refrained from sexual relationships with men, though he kept a fatherly interest in the career of various young men (such as Hugh Gaitskell, Richard Crossman and Tony Crosland, who had been noted for their good looks and had had same-sex experiences at Oxford) and was rather touchy-feely with them.

In 1951, Dalton wrote to Crossman: "Thinking of Tony, with all his youth and beauty and gaiety and charm... I weep. I am more fond of that young man than I can put into words." According to Nicholas Davenport, Dalton's unrequited feelings for Crosland became an embarrassing joke within the Labour Party.

Dalton's papers, including his diaries, are held at the LSE Library.  His diaries have been digitised and are available on LSE's Digital Library.

Awards
Dalton was president of the Ramblers' Association from 1948 to 1950, and Master of the Drapers' Company in 1958–59. He was created a life peer as Baron Dalton, of Forest and Frith in the County Palatine of Durham on 28 January 1960.

 Contributions in economics 
Dalton substantially expanded Max Otto Lorenz's work in the measurement of income inequality, offering both an expanded array of techniques but also a set of principles by which to comprehend shifts in an income distribution, thereby providing a more compelling theoretical basis for understanding relationships between incomes (1920).

Following a suggestion by Pigou (1912, p. 24), Dalton proposed the condition that a transfer of income from a richer to a poorer person, so long as that transfer does not reverse the ranking of the two, will result in greater equity (Dalton, p. 351). This principle has come to be known as the Pigou–Dalton principle (see, e.g., Amartya Sen, 1973).

Dalton offered a theoretical proposition of a positive functional relationship between income and economic welfare, stating that economic welfare increases at an exponentially decreasing rate with increased income, leading to the conclusion that maximum social welfare is achievable only when all incomes are equal.

Arms

 References 

Cited sources

Further reading
 , detailed coverage of nationalisation, welfare state and planning
 Dell, Edmund. The Chancellors: A History of the Chancellors of the Exchequer, 1945–90 (HarperCollins, 1997) pp 15–93.

Primary sources
 Hugh Dalton With British Guns in Italy (1919)
 Hugh Dalton Call Back Yesterday: Memoirs – 1887–1931 (1953) 
 Hugh Dalton The Fateful Years: Memoirs – 1931–1945  (1957) 
 Hugh Dalton High Tide and After: Memoirs – 1945–1960 (1962)

 References 

 
Dalton, H. The measurement of the inequality of incomes'', Economic Journal, 30 (1920), pp. 348–461.

External links 

 
 
 
 
 Hugh Dalton's papers at LSE Archives
 

1887 births
1962 deaths
Welsh military personnel
Academics of the London School of Economics
Alumni of King's College, Cambridge
Alumni of the London School of Economics
British Army personnel of World War I
Chairs of the Labour Party (UK)
Chancellors of the Duchy of Lancaster
Chancellors of the Exchequer of the United Kingdom
Foreign Office personnel of World War II
Labour Party (UK) MPs for English constituencies
Dalton, Hugh Dalton, Baron
Members of the Executive of the Labour and Socialist International
Members of the Fabian Society
Members of the Privy Council of the United Kingdom
Ministers in the Attlee governments, 1945–1951
Ministers in the Churchill wartime government, 1940–1945
Ministry of Economic Warfare
People educated at Eton College
People educated at Summer Fields School
People from Neath
Presidents of the Board of Trade
Royal Army Service Corps officers
Royal Artillery officers
Bisexual men
Bisexual politicians
LGBT life peers
English LGBT politicians
LGBT members of the Parliament of the United Kingdom
UK MPs 1924–1929
UK MPs 1929–1931
UK MPs 1935–1945
UK MPs 1945–1950
UK MPs 1950–1951
UK MPs 1951–1955
UK MPs 1955–1959
UK MPs who were granted peerages
Life peers created by Elizabeth II